Bruno Costa de Souza (born 6 February 1990), known as Bruno Costa, is a Brazilian footballer who plays as a left back for EC São Bernardo.

Career
Bruno Costa began his development in the youth system of the Brazilian club Atletico-Paranaense in 2004, and since 2009, he has defended the colours of the senior side, being loaned out to Joinville in 2013. He became supercampeão with the Atletico-Paranaense youth team, winning both the juvenile category, and U-15 juniors league titles.

References

External links

1990 births
Living people
Sportspeople from Salvador, Bahia
Brazilian footballers
Association football defenders
Campeonato Brasileiro Série A players
Campeonato Brasileiro Série B players
Campeonato Brasileiro Série C players
Club Athletico Paranaense players
Joinville Esporte Clube players
Botafogo Futebol Clube (SP) players
Clube Atlético Bragantino players
Mogi Mirim Esporte Clube players
Tupi Football Club players
Clube Atlético Linense players
Botafogo Futebol Clube (PB) players
Volta Redonda FC players
Esporte Clube Pelotas players
Associação Portuguesa de Desportos players
Esporte Clube Água Santa players